The Crosslé Car Company Ltd. is a racing car manufacturer based in Holywood, Northern Ireland. Crosslé was founded in 1957 by John Crosslé. Crosslé is the oldest surviving specialist racing car manufacturer in the United Kingdom.

Crosslé is known for its Formula Ford designs, particularly for the FF1600 class, and during the 1970s drivers of Crosslé cars won numerous championships. The company has produced cars for other national and international formulae, including Formula 5000, Formula Two and Formula Junior. It has also produced well-regarded cars for various classes in sports car racing. Many drivers who have since gone on to become household names drove Crosslé cars while in the early stages of their career. Among these are former Formula One drivers Nigel Mansell, John Watson, Eddie Irvine and Martin Donnelly. Former Jordan Grand Prix team owner Eddie Jordan also began his racing career in a Crosslé.

John Crosslé sold the company to Crosslé racer Arnie Black in 1997, who in turn sold it to former oil industry executive Paul McMorran in late 2012.

Dr John Crosslé MBE died on 31 August 2014, aged 82.

See also
Anson Cars
Lola Cars
Reynard Motorsport
Swift Engineering
Van Diemen

References

External links

Crosslé Car Company official website.

British racecar constructors
Car manufacturers of the United Kingdom
Cars of Northern Ireland
Companies of Northern Ireland
Vehicle manufacturing companies established in 1957
Brands of Northern Ireland
British companies established in 1957
1957 establishments in Northern Ireland
Manufacturing companies of Northern Ireland